Forward was an English-language weekly newspaper published from Colombo, an organ of the Communist Party of Sri Lanka. Forward was one of few political party-affiliated publications printed in English in Sri Lanka at the time.

References 

Communist newspapers
Communist Party of Sri Lanka organs
Defunct newspapers published in Sri Lanka
Defunct weekly newspapers
English-language newspapers published in Sri Lanka
Weekly newspapers published in Sri Lanka
Mass media in Colombo